Ray Ellis Hadley Jr. (October 6, 1943 – February 15, 1961) was an American figure skater who competed in pairs and ice dance with his sister Ila Ray Hadley.

Hadley was born in Seattle, Washington.  He and his sister won the bronze medal in pairs at the 1960 United States Figure Skating Championships and competed in the Winter Olympics and World Figure Skating Championships that year.  The next year, they finished second in pairs at the U.S. Championships and fourth at the North American Figure Skating Championships.  They died along with their mother on February 15, 1961 when Sabena Flight 548 crashed in Belgium en route to the World Championships in Prague.  He was 17 years old. His parents met in Eugene, Oregon and Hadley and his sister are buried in that city.

Results

Pairs

Ice Dance

References

External links
 U.S. Figure Skating biography
 Sports-Reference.com

American male pair skaters
American male ice dancers
Olympic figure skaters of the United States
Figure skaters at the 1960 Winter Olympics
1943 births
1961 deaths
Victims of aviation accidents or incidents in Belgium
Burials in Oregon
Victims of aviation accidents or incidents in 1961